Various is the third extended play by South Korean girl group Viviz. The EP was released by BPM Entertainment on January 31, 2023, and contains six tracks, including the lead single "Pull Up".

Background and release
On January 9, 2023, BPM Entertainment announced Viviz would be releasing their third extended play titled Various on January 31. A day later, the promotional schedule was released. On January 13, the track listing was released with "Pull Up" announced as the lead single. On January 27, the album's track preview video was released. The music videos teaser for "Pull Up" was released on January 29 and 30. The EP was released alongside the music video for "Pull Up" on January 31.

Track listing

Charts

Weekly charts

Monthly charts

Release history

References

Viviz albums
2023 EPs
Korean-language EPs